Ernest Preston Lane (28 November 1886, Russellville, Tennessee – October 1969) was an American mathematician, specializing in differential geometry.

Education and career
In 1909, he received his bachelor's degree in from the University of Tennessee. Later in life, he went on to receive his master's degree from the University of Virginia in 1913. He taught mathematics at several academic institutions before receiving in 1918 from the University of Chicago his PhD under Ernest Julius Wilczynski with thesis  Conjugate systems with indeterminate axis curves. At the University of Wisconsin Lane was from 1919 to 1923 an assistant professor. At the University of Chicago he was from 1923 to 1927 an assistant professor, from 1927 to 1928 an associate professor, and from 1928 to 1952 a full professor, retiring in 1952 as professor emeritus. He was the chair of the University of Chicago's mathematics department from 1941 to 1946.

Lane was a Guggenheim Fellow for the academic year 1926–1927. His doctoral students include Alice T. Schafer,  and Sun Guangyuan.

Selected publications

References

1886 births
1969 deaths
University of Tennessee alumni
University of Virginia alumni
University of Chicago alumni
University of Chicago faculty
20th-century American mathematicians
Differential geometers
People from Hamblen County, Tennessee